The Gladiators (1939) is the first novel by the author Arthur Koestler; it portrays the effects of the Spartacus revolt in the Roman Republic. Published in 1939, it was later reprinted in other editions.

Introduction
The book is the first of a trilogy, including Darkness at Noon (1940), and Arrival and Departure (1943), which address idealism going wrong.  This is a common theme in Koestler's work and life. Koestler uses his portrayal of the original slave revolt to examine the experience of the 20th-century political left in Europe following the rise of a Communist government in the Soviet Union.  He published it on the brink of World War II. Originally written in German, the novel was translated into English for other audiences and was published in 1939. In the UK it was translated by the German-born, British writer and artist Edith Simon. The manuscript of the German version, for which no publisher had been found, was lost during Koestler's flight at the Fall of France; the German edition finally published after the war had to be re-translated from English.

In 1998 the British critic Geoffrey Wheatcroft wrote of the novel:
"In The Gladiators, Koestler used Spartacus's revolt around 65BC to explore the search for the just city, the inevitable compromises of revolution, the conflict of ends and means, the question of whether and when it is justifiable to sacrifice lives for an abstract ideal."

Plot

In 73 BCE, forty gladiators escape from the school at Capua belonging to Lentulus Batiatus. They seize weapons and armour and flee southwards, pillaging and killing. They quickly attract followers to their cause; runaway slaves, freemen, young and old. Leadership falls nominally to Spartacus the Thracian and Crixus the Gaul.

Spartacus, who has some military training, tries to form the mob into an army in the Roman style. They eventually retire to a more defensible position on Mount Vesuvius, from where they defeat and massacre a Roman army sent against them. Still largely directionless, they move south into the Campania in the direction of the south coast, looting many fortified towns.

They divide into two large groups; that led by Crixus moves north against Rome. They are massacred and those not killed in battle are crucified along the Appian Way. Crixus, however, escapes and rejoins the other group. They establish a camp outside the wall of the coastal city of Thurium. The inhabitants are mainly descended from Greek colonists and have no love for Rome.

Spartacus, now styling himself ‘Imperator’ negotiates a truce with the Council of Thurium, a deal decidedly more in favour of the slave army, who now style themselves the Sun City. They commence the building of a new city, where all are equal, all work for the common good, all share the same (meagre) food.  Spartacus enforces new laws with harsh discipline. Fulvius the lawyer from Capua commences a chronicle of the movement (which is never to be completed), and becomes the main political advisor to Spartacus.

With a population of 100,000, they receive emissaries from other polities and negotiate treaties and trade relations, including with the pirates that rule the nearby seas. They try unsuccessfully to encourage other slave populations to rise against Rome. But when the sea routes are closed by naval battles, food becomes even more meagre and the murmuring of the population becomes major.

One group decides to attack and loot the rich city of Metapontum. The surviving attackers are brought back by Spartacus's loyalists and the leaders crucified, which further increases discontent. Cut off by a large approaching Roman army led by Crassus, they bargain with the pirate fleet to convey them to Sicily, but are abandoned by them after handing over all their remaining money. They finally depart, destroying the Sun City behind them. A group led by Crixus, mainly Celts and Gauls, fights the Roman legions but is destroyed. Spartacus tries to negotiate an honourable surrender with Crassus, but is unsuccessful.

Battle is joined. The slave army are defeated and Spartacus killed. The survivors are crucified or sold into slavery.

Reception

The novel is generally not as well known to English-speaking audiences as the later American novel on this topic, Spartacus (1951), by Howard Fast, a bestseller adapted for Stanley Kubrick's award-winning 1960 film of the same name, which reached wide audiences and stimulated sales of Fast's novel.

See also

 Spartacus (1951) novel by Howard Fast, which was adapted for the 1960 film.
 Spartacus, 1931 novel by the Scottish writer Lewis Grassic Gibbon.

References

1939 British novels
Novels by Arthur Koestler
Novels about Spartacus
British historical novels
Jonathan Cape books
Novels set in the 1st century BC
1939 debut novels